Kapow Records is a record label that was founded in 2000 in Orange County, California. It later relocated to Los Angeles in early 2005.

Discography
 Kapow #1 The Starvations Church Of The Double Cross 7"
 Kapow #2 Throw Rag Bag Of Glue 7"  
 Kapow #3 Cavity Miscellaneous Recollections 92-97 CD  
 Kapow #4 Le Shok LA To NY 6"  
 Kapow #5 The Catheters It Can't Stay This Way (Forever) 7"  
 Kapow #6 The Stitches Four More Songs From The Stitches 12"EP  
 Kapow #6 The Stitches Five More Songs From The Stitches CDEP  
 Kapow #7 Alleged Gunmen Audio Invasion 7"  
 Kapow #8 The Starvations One Long Night CDEP  
 Kapow #9 Rolling Blackouts Add Vice 7"  
 Kapow #10 The Orphans (band) Chinatown 7"  
 Kapow #11 Lipstick Pickups Better Than You 7"  
 Kapow #12 Street Trash 12"EP  
 Kapow #14 Killer Dreamer Survival Guns 7"  
 Kapow #15 Alleged Gunmen Return To Zero LP/CD  
 Kapow #16 The Dirtbombs Merit 7"  
 Kapow #17 Killer Dreamer Killer Dreamer LP/CD  
 Kapow #18 The Leeches Integratron 7"  
 Kapow #19 Thee Make-Out Party! Wreckless Epic 7"  
 Kapow #20 CCT Incommunicado CDEP  
 Kapow #21 Almighty Do Me A Favor Wont Be None 7" 
 Kapow #22 The Red Onions I Want Your Love 7" 
 Kapow #23 Almighty Do Me A Favor ADMF CD 
 Kapow #24 Lipstick Pickups Domesticated Animals LP

See also 
 List of record labels

External links
 

American record labels
Record labels established in 2000